Rev. Fr. Dr. Abraham Lotha is an Indian anthropologist from Nagaland and the former Principal of St. Joseph's College, Jakhama, Nagaland who served from April 2011 till May 2015. He serves as the current President of the Lotha Academy. and also wrote several books on Naga anthropology. Lotha is an ethnic Naga.

Bibliography
History of Naga Anthropology 1832–1947, 2007 
The Raging Mithun : Challenges of Naga Nationalism Christianity, 2013 
The Hornbill Spirit : Nagas Living Their Nationalism, 2016

Accolades
In 2019, Abraham Lotha was awarded the Gordon Graham Prize for Naga Literature in the Non-Fiction category for his book, “The Hornbill Spirit: Nagas Living Their Nationalism”

References

Living people
Year of birth missing (living people)